The Milu Park, or Milu Yuan, is a large public park located in southern Beijing, China named after its captive breeding herd of milu or Père David's Deer. It was once called the Nanyuan Garden or Nanhaizi Garden, which was the imperial hunting grounds for Ming and Qing emperors.  The gardens, palaces, forests, rivers, marshes and grasslands used to be enclosed by walls
and gates. 

Milu Yuan is now a public park and an ecological research center that serves as a natural park for animals in Beijing. Among the attractions are the Père David's Deer or milu a deer that became extinct in China toward the end of the 19th century during the Qing Dynasty. The deer was re-introduced to Beijing from Britain in the 1980s.

External links
About the Milu Yuan
Official Park Site (Site is in Chinese)

2000 establishments in China
Parks in Beijing
Protected areas established in 2000